This is a list of games for the VIC-20 personal computer, sorted alphabetically. See lists of video games for other gaming platforms. A section at the bottom contains games written by hobbyists long after the mainstream popularity of the VIC-20 waned. Many of these are unlicensed clones of arcade games or games from other systems.

There are 400 commercial and 26 hobbyist-developed games on this list

0–9
3 Deep Space
3D Man
3D Maze
3D Silicon Fish
3D Time Trek

A

B

C

D

E-F

G-H

I-J

K-L

M

N-O

P

Q-R

S

T

U-V

W-X-Y-Z

Hobbyist-developed games

References

 
Commodore VIC-20